Thomas Cope (c.1814 – 3 April 1882) was a politician in colonial Victoria (Australia).

Cope was born in Postgate, Staffordshire, England, and arrived in Melbourne around 1857.

Cope was a member of the Victorian Legislative Assembly for Normanby from May 1868 to April 1877	and member for Portland from	May 1877 to February 1880.

Cope died in Abbotsford, Victoria.

References

1814 births
1882 deaths
Members of the Victorian Legislative Assembly
19th-century Australian politicians
English emigrants to colonial Australia